The 2014 LFL US Season was the fifth season of LFL United States, the second in the rebranded Legends Football League, and the seventh in the combined history of that league and its predecessor, the Lingerie Football League. The season featured 10 teams in various cities across the United States.

Teams

Schedule

Playoffs

Standings

Eastern Conference

Western Conference

 * conference champion, ^ clinched playoff berth

2014 Legends Cup

The 2014 Legends Cup featured the defending champion Chicago Bliss versus the Atlanta Steam.  Chicago came into the game a 20-point favorite.  The Bliss scored first to take the 8-0 lead but Atlanta came back before the half to make the score 8-6 at the break.  Chicago opened their lead 16-6 on the final play of the third quarter.  Atlanta continued to remain close but Chicago never surrendered the lead, holding on to win the game 24-18 and capture their second consecutive Legends Cup championship.  Chicago running back Chrisdell Harris was named MVP of the game.

Awards
League MVP
 Danika Brace - Las Vegas Sin
 Saige Steinmetz - Jacksonville Breeze
 Chrisdell Harris - Chicago Bliss
 Stevi Schnoor - Seattle Mist

Offensive Player of the Year
 Sindy Cummings - Las Vegas Sin
 Chrisdell Harris - Chicago Bliss
 Markie Henderson - Las Vegas Sin
 Saige Steinmetz - Jacksonville Breeze

Defensive Player of the Year
 Danika Brace - Las Vegas Sin
 Jessica Hopkins - Seattle Mist
 Lily Granston - Seattle Mist
 Theresa Petruziello - Omaha Heart

Rookie of the Year
 Sindy Cummings - Las Vegas Sin
 Lily Granston - Seattle Mist
 Dakota Hughes - Atlanta Steam
 Markie Henderson - Las Vegas Sin

Mortaza Award
 Dakota Hughes - Atlanta Steam
 Danika Brace - Las Vegas Sin
 Ogom Chijindu - Los Angeles Temptation
 Carmen Bourseau - Los Angeles Temptation

Coach of the Year
 Dane Robinson - Atlanta Steam
 Eddie Chan - Los Angeles Temptation
 Keith Hac - Chicago Bliss
 Tui Suiaunoa - Las Vegas Sin

Team of the Year
 Atlanta Steam
 Los Angeles Temptation
 Chicago Bliss
 Las Vegas Sin

8th Man Award (Best Fan Base)
 Seattle Mist
 Chicago Bliss
 Omaha Heart
 Atlanta Steam

Legends Cup MVP
 Chrisdell Harris - Chicago Bliss

LFL USA 2014 Nominees

References

Lingerie Football League
Legends Football League